Ashland High School (AHS) is the only high school of the Ashland City School District of Ashland, Ohio. It has around 1200 students.

Athletics
Ashland High School has a long tradition in sports, especially baseball, basketball, soccer, volleyball, track and field, football and golf. The boys varsity golf teams have the only state championships recorded in school history, in 1962 and 1998. The boys and girls golf teams advanced to the OHSAA Division 1 State Golf Championships in 2008 and the girls team returned to the championships in 2009 where senior Rachel Thompson received medalist runner-up honors.

Ohio High School Athletic Association State Championships

 Boys' Golf – 1962, 1998

Notable alumni
Ernest Cline – novelist and screenwriter.
Johnny Roseboro – former MLB player (Los Angeles Dodgers, Minnesota Twins, Washington Senators)
Tim Seder – former National Football League player with the Dallas Cowboys and Jacksonville Jaguars
Robert Springer – NASA astronaut

References

External links
Official site of school

High schools in Ashland County, Ohio
Public high schools in Ohio
High School